Lintott-Alexander Park is a  park in Chehalis, Washington, located west of I-5 and south of Washington State Route 6. Due to its location in a bend of the Chehalis River and at the confluence of the Newaukum River, the park can flood in most years.

Originally known as Alexander Park, named after the Chehalis family who donated the land to the city in 1920, it once contained bath houses, a boardwalk, outdoor kitchens, and a wading pool.  The park was noted on a national level in 1928 for hosting the baking of the "World's Largest Strawberry Shortcake" and again in 1931 when a 7,200 egg omelet was cooked in a 1/2-ton custom-built frying pan at an annual park picnic.

The city briefly turned the park's responsibility over to the Boy Scouts in the 1980s. With increasing liability concerns due to vandalism, coupled with budget and maintenance issues, the park became "overgrown and abandoned" and was closed by the city in 1988. In 2004, a prior resident, Jim Lintott, donated $25,000 in honor of his father, beginning a movement to renovate the closed park. Other contributions followed quickly, including a donation raised by a local power plant and its employees to commemorate a local Chehalis resident, Traci Hampton.

The restored park was renamed officially as Robert E. Lintott-Alexander Park with permission from the Alexander family and reopened with playgrounds, sport courts, picnic areas, and a perimeter walking path; future maintenance is to be overseen by the Chehalis Foundation and voluntary efforts of the community.

See also
 Parks and recreation in Chehalis, Washington

Notes

References 

Parks in Washington (state)